al-Jafr is a mystical book which, in Shia belief, includes esoteric teachings, dictated by the Islamic prophet Muhammad to Ali. Ali was the cousin and son-in-law of Muhammad and is regarded by the Shia as their first Imam and the rightful successor to Muhammad.

In Shia belief, al-Jafr was a source of special knowledge in Muhammad's household available to the successors of Ali, namely, Shia Imams, which was handed down from each Imam to the next. The book is said to contain all information ever needed in matters of religion, including a detailed penal code that accounts even for bruises. The first mention of the book is often associated with the sixth Shia Imam, Ja'far al-Sadiq. The Twelver Shia believe that the book is now in the possession of the last Imam, Muhammad al-Mahdi.  

According to some Shi'i traditions,  refers to two leather bags, one of which contains various scrolls of the past prophets and the scrolls inherited from Muhammad, Ali, and Fatima, daughter of Muhammad. The other bag is said to contain the armour and weapons of Muhammad.

Etymology
The word  has multiple meanings in Arabic: numerical symbolism, science of numbers, numerical symbolism of letters, numerology, science of letters, alphabetical symbolism, or divination. The prefix  means "the".

Contents
The contents of  have been reported differently and the book is said to contain:
 the secret teachings of the Shia Imams.
 knowledge of all past and future events pertaining to Muslims.
 the knowledge of Muhammad.
 the Islamic rules, directives, and matters about wars. 
 the knowledge of the Israelite scholars.

Popular culture
The term al-Jafr is mentioned in the storyline of One Thousand and One Nights, and a description of al-Jafr is offered by Burton in his supplement to the book.

See also
 Letter of Ali ibn Abi Talib to Malik al-Ashtar
Mushaf
 Khutbah
 List of Shia books
 al-Jamia
 Book of Ali
The Book of Fatimah
al-Risalah al-Huquq
 The Fifteen Whispered Prayers
 al-Risalah al-Dhahabiah
 al-Sahifat al-Ridha
 Ghurar al-Hikam wa Durar al-Kalim
 Nahj al-Balagha
 al-Sahifa al-Sajjadiyya

References

Sources

External links
 More information about al-Jafr on Shia websites:

Kitab al-Kafi, Chapter 40

Shia literature
Shia Islam